Chen Zhaojing (born 5 April 1969) is a former Chinese track and field athlete who competed in sprint events.

She won four national titles in the 200 metres between 1991 and 1994. Chen also won the 200 m event at the 1993 National Games of China in 22.56s, equaling Taiwanese Wang Huei-chen area record in the process. This mark stood until Susanthika Jayasinghe of Sri Lanka broke it in 1997, clocking 22.33s.

Chen took part in the 1992 Summer Olympics and to the 1993 World Indoor Championships, without reaching the final.

Achievements

Personal bests

References
 http://www.all-athletics.com/node/292818
 

Living people
1969 births
Chinese female sprinters
Olympic athletes of China
Athletes (track and field) at the 1992 Summer Olympics
Olympic female sprinters
20th-century Chinese women